Chatsworth may refer to the following, all named for Chatsworth House in England :

Places

Australia
 Chatsworth, Queensland a semi-rural locality in the Gympie Region
 Electoral district of Chatsworth, Queensland, Australia

Canada
 Chatsworth, Ontario, a township municipality
 Chatsworth, Ontario (village), located within above township

Singapore
 Chatsworth International School, Singapore
  Chatsworth Mediart Academy, Singapore

South Africa
 Chatsworth, Durban
 Chatsworth, Western Cape

United Kingdom
 Chatsworth, Derbyshire
 Chatsworth House (Duke of Devonshire), at Chatsworth, Derbyshire

United States
 Chatsworth, Los Angeles, California, a district in the San Fernando Valley
 Chatsworth Peak, a peak in the Simi Hills overlooking Chatsworth, Los Angeles
 Chatsworth station, a passenger train station in Chatsworth, Los Angeles
 Chatsworth Hills Academy, Chatsworth, Los Angeles
 Chatsworth, Georgia
 Chatsworth, Illinois
 Chatsworth, Iowa
 Chatsworth, New Jersey

Zimbabwe
 Chatsworth, Zimbabwe

Other
 Chatsworth Television, a British television production company
 1887 Great Chatsworth train wreck, bridge collapse on the Toledo, Peoria & Western railroad in Illinois
 2008 Chatsworth train collision, a collision between a Metrolink commuter train and a Union Pacific freight train in the Chatsworth district of Los Angeles on September 12, 2008
 Chatsworth (TV series), a British documentary  television series
 Chatsworth Estate, the name of a fictional council estate in the city of Manchester in the British TV series Shameless

See also
Cotsworth (disambiguation)
Coatsworth